The Tour de Siak is a multi-day cycling race held annually in the Siak Regency of Indonesia. It has been part of UCI Asia Tour in category 2.2 since 2018.

Winners

References

Cycle races in Indonesia
UCI Asia Tour races
Recurring sporting events established in 2013
2013 establishments in Indonesia